Nehemiah George Massey (September 5, 1903 – April 8, 1964) was a Canadian politician. He served in the Legislative Assembly of British Columbia from 1956 to 1960, as a Social Credit member for the constituency of Delta.

Massey was born in Courtown near Gorey, County Wexford, Ireland and immigrated to Canada in 1922 to avoid threats by the Irish Republican Army.

Massey lived in Regina and moved to Ladner, British Columbia in 1936. He worked at a logging camp, farm hand and mechanic.

Honours

The George Massey Tunnel was renamed in his honour.

References

Politicians from County Wexford
Irish emigrants to Canada (before 1923)
British Columbia Social Credit Party MLAs
1903 births
1964 deaths